Wolfgang Amadeus Mozart's Piano Sonata No. 4 in E-flat major, K. 282 / 189g, (1774) is a sonata in three movements:

A typical performance takes about 12 minutes.

Mozart wrote the work down during a visit paid to Munich for the production of La finta giardiniera from late 1774 to the beginning of the following March.

The first movement is in sonata form.The second movement is two minuets, and the first one is in B-flat major. The second one is in E flat major.The third movement is also in sonata form and returns to the home key in eflat major.

External links

  (Alte Mozart-Ausgabe version)

Piano Sonata 04
Compositions in E-flat major
1774 compositions